Certified Grocers Midwest was a retailers' cooperative serving  independent supermarkets in six states: Illinois, Indiana, Iowa, Michigan, Minnesota, and Wisconsin. It was founded in 1940 and was a member of Retailer Owned Food Distributors & Associates. Many of its stores served the African American who were mostly migrants from the Deep South or descendants of those migrants along later with the Hispanic community. It distributed Country's Delight brand bread, milk and ice cream as store brands along with Raggedy Ann and the Certified label. It merged into Central Grocers Cooperative in 2008. Central Grocers Cooperative went bankrupt in May 2017. 

It was headquartered in Hodgkins, Illinois, near Chicago.

References

External links 
 Certified Grocers Midwest Web site

Companies based in Cook County, Illinois
Economy of the Midwestern United States
Defunct supermarkets of the United States
American companies established in 1940
Retail companies established in 1940
Companies that filed for Chapter 11 bankruptcy in 2017
Companies that have filed for Chapter 7 bankruptcy
American companies disestablished in 2017
Retail companies disestablished in 2017
Retailers' cooperatives in the United States